The 2022 international cricket season was from May 2022 to September 2022. 15 Tests, 71 One Day Internationals (ODIs), and 251 Twenty20 Internationals (T20Is) matches, including the 2022 Asia Cup, were played in this season. In women's international cricket, one women's Test match, 18 Women's One Day Internationals (WODIs) and 144 Women's Twenty20 Internationals (WT20Is) were played in this season. Included among the T20I/WT20I matches were a number of series involving associate nations.

In May 2022, the International Cricket Council (ICC) confirmed that the third cycle of the ICC Women's Championship would start during this season, with the Pakistan women's team hosting Sri Lanka in June 2022. At the same time, the ICC also awarded WODI status to the Netherlands, Papua New Guinea, Scotland, Thailand and the United States. Also in women's international cricket, a tournament was held as part of the 2022 Commonwealth Games, in Birmingham, England, in July and August 2022.

In September 2021, the fifth Test match between England and India was cancelled a few hours before the scheduled start, due to COVID-19 cases in the Indian camp. The match was rescheduled, and took place in July 2022, ahead of India's white-ball tour of England. In July 2022, Cambodia, the Ivory Coast and Uzbekistan were all awarded Associate Membership of the ICC.

Season overview

Rankings

The following were the rankings at the beginning of the season.

On-going tournaments
The following were the rankings at the beginning of the season.

May

Sri Lanka in Bangladesh

Namibia in Zimbabwe

Sri Lanka women in Pakistan

2022 United States Tri-Nation Series (round 12)

West Indies in Netherlands

June

New Zealand in England

South Africa women in Ireland

Afghanistan in Zimbabwe

Australia in Sri Lanka

West Indies in Pakistan

2022 United States Tri-Nation Series (round 13)

South Africa in India

Bangladesh in West Indies

2022 Uganda Cricket World Cup Challenge League B

England in Netherlands

India women in Sri Lanka

India in Ireland

South Africa women in England

July

India in England

New Zealand in Ireland

2022 Scotland Tri-Nation Series (round 14)

Pakistan in Sri Lanka

2022 Ireland women's Tri-Nation Series

South Africa in England

India in West Indies and United States

New Zealand in Scotland

2022 Canada Cricket World Cup Challenge League A

Cricket at the 2022 Commonwealth Games

Bangladesh in Zimbabwe

August

South Africa vs Ireland in England

2022 Jersey Cricket World Cup Challenge League B

New Zealand in the Netherlands

Afghanistan in Ireland

2022 Scotland Tri-Nation Series (round 15)

New Zealand in West Indies

Pakistan in Netherlands

India in Zimbabwe

Ireland women in the Netherlands

2022 Asia Cup

Zimbabwe in Australia

September

Ireland women in Scotland

India women in England

See also
 Associate international cricket in 2022

Notes

References

2022 in cricket